"Jeannie Jeannie Jeannie" is a song by Eddie Cochran recorded and released as a single in January 1958 on Liberty Records 55123. It was a minor hit for Cochran and stalled at number 94 on the Billboard charts. "Jeannie, Jeannie, Jeannie" was posthumously released in the United Kingdom in 1961 on the London Records label and rose to number 31. Later versions are most commonly known as "Jeanie, Jeanie, Jeanie". The song was first written as "Johnny, Johnny, Johnny" for  The Georgettes, but they never recorded it.

Personnel
 Eddie Cochran: vocal, guitar
 Conny 'Guybo' Smith: electric bass
 Earl Palmer: drums
 (possibly) Ray Johnson: piano

Chart performance

Stray Cats version

The Stray Cats recorded a version of "Jeanie Jeanie Jeanie" which was released on their first UK album Stray Cats in 1981. The song was also released on their debut US album Built for Speed. The song was often featured in their live shows and several live versions are available. The Stray Cats' version features rewritten and raunchier lyrics than the Eddie Cochran version.

Other versions
 Vince Taylor And His Play-Boys (as Jenny, Jenny, Jenny) - 1962
 Showaddywaddy
 Teddy & The Tigers - 1978
 The Inmates - 1979
 The Firebirds - 1991
 The Real Kids - 1993
 Darrel Higham - 1997, 2004. UK rockabilly singer and noted Eddie Cochran expert Darrel Higham recorded "Jeanie Jeanie Jeanie" for his 1997 album The Cochran Connection and another version in 2004 for Midnight Commotion.
 The Top Cats - 2004

References

External links
Eddie Cochran US discography on Remember Eddie Cochran
Stray Cats discography
Cover versions of Jeannie Jeannie Jeannie on Second hand Songs

1958 singles
Liberty Records singles
Eddie Cochran songs
Showaddywaddy songs
Stray Cats songs
Songs written by George Motola
1958 songs